The 2017 Patna Pirates season statistics for the contact team sport of kabaddi are here.

Squad

League stage

Leg 01

Leg 02

Leg 03

Leg 04

Leg 05

Leg 06

Leg 07

Leg 08 (Home Leg)

Leg 09

Leg 10

Leg 11

Leg 12

See also
Kabaddi in India
Punjabi Kabaddi

References

Pro Kabaddi League teams